Blue Nile is one of the eighteen states of the Republic of the Sudan. It was established by presidential decree nº 3 in 1992 and it is named after the Blue Nile River.

The region is host to around forty different ethnic groups. Its economic activity is based on agriculture and livestock and increasing mineral exploitation.

In 2011, residents of Blue Nile were scheduled to hold ill-defined "popular consultations" to determine the constitutional future of the state, per the Comprehensive Peace Agreement. Instead, a dispute over the rightful government of the state, and the determination of Omar al-Bashir to eradicate the Sudan People's Liberation Movement-North, have led to a renewed insurgency and a refugee crisis.  It appears that the consultations have been postponed indefinitely.

Administration 
The State is sub-divided into six districts (with 2006 Census populations shown hereafter):
 Ad-Damazin (212,712)
 Al Kormok (110,815)
 Ar Roseires (215,857)
 Tadamon (77,668)
 Bau or Baw (127,251)
 Qeissan (87,809)

State Governors

 Feb 1994 – Dec 1997 : Abdalla Abu-Fatma Abdalla
 Dec 1997 – Jan 2000 : Abd ar-Rahman Abu Madyan
 Jan 2000 – Feb 2001 : Al-Hadi Bashra
 Feb 2001 –  2003 : Hassan Hamadayn Suleiman (1st time)
 2003 – 2004?: Abdallah Uthman al-Haj
 2004 – 2005: Hassan Hamadayn Suleiman (2nd time)
 Sep 2005 – Jul 2007 : Abdel Rahman Mohamed Abu Madien
 Jul 2007 – 20 Sep 2011 : Malik Agar Eyre                                       
 Sep 2011 –  Apr 2013 : Yahya Mohamed Khair (1st time)                     
 1 Apr 2013 –  May 2018 : Hussein Yassin Hamad
 14 May 2018 –  Feb 2019 : Khalid Hussein Mohamed Omer
 24 Feb 2019 – Apr 2019 : Yahya Mohamed Khair (2nd time)
 Apr 2019 - 2020 : Ahmed Abdul-Rahim Shukratall
 22 Jul 2020 - 27 Dec 2020 : Abdul Rahman Mohammed Nour al-Daiem
 Dec 2020 - 13 Jun 2021 :  Jamal Abdel Hadi
 13 Jun 2021 - Incumbent : Ahmed al-Omda

Geography 
Blue Nile state has an area of 45,844 km2 and an estimated population of 1,193,293. The Central Bureau of Statistics quoted the population at 832,112 in the 2006 census. Ad-Damazin is the capital of the state. The state of Blue Nile is home to the Roseires Dam, the main source of hydroelectric power in Sudan until the completion of the Merowe Dam in 2010.

Languages 
The following languages are spoken in Blue Nile state according to Ethnologue.
Berta language
Gumuz language
Hausa language
Eastern Jebel languages
Gaam language
Aka language
Kelo language
Molo language
Nilotic languages
Burun language
Jumjum language
Omotic languages
Ganza language
Koman languages
Komo language
Gule language
Uduk language
Other languages
Fulfulde language

References

External links 
 History and geography
 UN Work Plan for Blue Nile State

 
States of Sudan